Pradeep Jaiswal is Shiv Sena politician from Aurangabad, Maharashtra. He is current Member of Legislative Assembly from Aurangabad Central Vidhan Sabha constituency as a member of Shiv Sena. He had also served as Mayor of Aurangabad Municipal Corporation.

Positions held
 1996: Elected to 11th Lok Sabha
 2009: Elected to Maharashtra Legislative Assembly 
 2014: Appointed Shiv Sena Aurangabad City Chief (Mahanagar Pramukh) 
 2019: Elected to Maharashtra Legislative Assembly

References

External links
  Shivsena Home Page 
 Pradeepjaiswal.in

Living people
1960 births
Maharashtra MLAs 2009–2014
People from Maharashtra
India MPs 1996–1997
People from Aurangabad, Maharashtra
Marathi politicians
Shiv Sena politicians
Lok Sabha members from Maharashtra
People from Marathwada
Dr. Babasaheb Ambedkar Marathwada University alumni